Andrea Schreiner (born 27 April 1959) is a Canadian rower. She competed in the women's single sculls event at the 1984 Summer Olympics.

References

External links
 
 
 

1959 births
Living people
Canadian female rowers
Olympic rowers of Canada
Rowers at the 1984 Summer Olympics
Place of birth missing (living people)
Commonwealth Games medallists in rowing
Commonwealth Games gold medallists for Canada
Rowers at the 1986 Commonwealth Games
20th-century Canadian women
Medallists at the 1986 Commonwealth Games